Oleksandr Mykolaiovych Tkachenko (born 7 March 1939) is a Soviet-Ukrainian politician who served as a People's Deputy of Ukraine from 1994 to 2012, variously representing the Peasant Party of Ukraine and the Communist Party of Ukraine. Between 7 July 1998 and 21 January 2000, Tkachenko was the Chairman of the Verkhovna Rada.

Biography
Tkachenko was born on 7 March 1939, in Shpola, Cherkasy Oblast. In 1963, he graduated from the Bila Tserkva Agriculture Institute. Between 1963 and 1981, he worked in Tarashcha Raion, Kyiv Oblast, first as an agronomist and later as a local Communist Party leader. In 1981, he became an inspector of the Central Committee of the Communist Party of Ukraine. In 1982, he was appointed Governor of Ternopil Oblast, and in 1985, he was appointed Minister of Agriculture of the Ukrainian Soviet Socialist Republic.

In 1991 and 1999, he was a candidate in the elections for President of Ukraine. On both occasions he withdrew his candidacy, in favour of Leonid Kravchuk in 1991 and Petro Symonenko in 1999.

Tkachenko was a member of the 11th convocation of the Supreme Soviet of the Ukrainian SSR, and in 1994 was elected to the Verkhovna Rada (parliament of Ukraine) for the first of five consecutive terms. Between May 1994 and April 1998 he was the First Deputy Chairman of the Parliament, and was Chairman of the Verkhovna Rada from 7 July 1998 to 21 January 2000, when was dismissed for violating parliamentary session regulations.

References

External links
 OpenUA: Oleksandr Tkachenko

1939 births
Living people
People from Shpola
Komsomol of Ukraine members
Chairmen of the Verkhovna Rada
Deputy chairmen of the Verkhovna Rada
Communist Party of Ukraine politicians
Politicians of the Ukrainian Soviet Socialist Republic
Communist Party of Ukraine (Soviet Union) politicians
Peasant Party of Ukraine politicians
First deputy chairpersons of the Council of Ministers of Ukraine
Recipients of the Order of Lenin
Rural economy ministers of Ukraine
Bila Tserkva National Agrarian University alumni
Kyiv Higher Party School alumni
Eleventh convocation members of the Verkhovna Rada of the Ukrainian Soviet Socialist Republic
21st-century Ukrainian politicians